Heptatriacontanoic acid, or heptatriacontylic acid, is a 37-carbon saturated fatty acid.

Sources
Heptatriacontanoic acid is present in Abelmoschus manihot and Alpinia nigra. Heptatriacontanoic acid was also measured in zooplankton.

Compounds
The compound 4,21-dimethyl-5,19-di-(trans)-enoyl-heptatriacontanoic acid is the "structure of the major homolog of free mycobacteric acids" of Mycobacterium brumae.

Preparation
The expired U.S. patent 5502226 covers a method of ω-hydroxy acid preparation that includes heptatriacontanoic acid.

See also
List of saturated fatty acids
List of carboxylic acids

References

External links

Fatty acids
Alkanoic acids